Andrew Parsons may refer to:

 Andrew Parsons (American politician) (1817–1855), politician from the U.S. state of Michigan
 Andrew Parsons (photographer), British photographer and political advisor
 Andrew Parsons (Canadian politician) (born 1979), Canadian politician and lawyer
 Andrew Parsons (sports administrator) (born 1977), Brazilian sports administrator and journalist
 Andy Parsons (born 1967), English comedian and writer
 Andy Parsons (darts player) (born 1981), English darts player

See also
Drew Parsons (disambiguation)